Grona triflora, known as creeping tick trefoil or three-flower beggarweed, is a plant in the family Fabaceae. It is native to tropical regions around the globe and introduced to subtropical regions including the southern United States.

Phytochemicals
Grona triflora (Desmodium triflorum) contains alkaloids including N,N-dimethyltryptophan methyl ester, dimethyltryptamine-N-oxide, hypaphorine (structurally related to plakohypaphorine), phenylethylamine, hordenine, tyramine, and trigonelline.

Medicinal applications and qualities
Creeping tick trefoil has been utilized in folk medicine. Conditions it has been used for include wounds, diarrhea, rheumatism, dysentery, and skin diseases.  

Known substances found in trefoils include alkaloids and flavonoids. The entire plant is used in human nutritional treatment.

Agricultural applications
Creeping tick trefoil is used in agriculture similarly to the closely related Desmodium; see Desmodium#uses.

References

triflora